Exeter station is an Amtrak train station located in Exeter, New Hampshire. The station has one low side platform with an accessible high section serving the single track of the Pan Am Railways Freight Main Line. On average, 230 passengers board or detrain daily, making it the busiest stop in New Hampshire.

The station opened on December 15, 2001 when Downeaster service began. The former Boston and Maine Railroad station, built in 1891 and used until 1967, is located nearby.

References

External links 

Exeter, NH (USA Rail Guide -- Train Web)

Amtrak stations in New Hampshire
Stations along Boston and Maine Railroad lines
Transportation buildings and structures in Rockingham County, New Hampshire
Exeter, New Hampshire
Railway stations in the United States opened in 2001